Dasychira obliquata, the streaked tussock moth, is a species of tussock moth in the family Erebidae. It is found in North America.

References

Further reading

 
 
 

Lymantriinae
Articles created by Qbugbot
Moths described in 1866